Peristeri is a station of Athens Metro Line 2 since the Anthoupoli extension opened on 6 April 2013.

References

Athens Metro stations
Railway stations opened in 2013
2013 establishments in Greece